Se solicitan modelos ("Models are Sought") is a 1954 Mexican film directed by Chano Urueta and starring Sara Montiel, Chula Prieto and Domingo Soler. It was one of the last films Montiel did in Mexico before being called by Hollywood; after a brief spell in the United States, she would focus her film career on her native Spain.

Plot
A clothing store is about to go bankrupt because of its conservative way of modeling the dresses, so they hire new models.

Cast
 Sara Montiel - Rosina
 Raúl Martínez - Raúl
 Chula Prieto - Reyna
 Domingo Soler - Don Lázaro
 Antonio Espino - Facundo
 Amparo Arozamena - Laura
 Maruja Grifell - Dueña escuela modelos
 Eufrosina García - Señora Silvanito
 Carlota Solares - Doña Luisa
 Beatriz Saavedra - Amiga de Reyna
 León Barroso

Reception
R. Hernandez-Rodriguez in Splendors of Latin Cinema listed the film among films of the era that were "more entertaining, but definitely less preocupied with contemporary issues" that their contemporaries.

References

External links
 

1954 films
1950s Spanish-language films
Films directed by Chano Urueta
Mexican black-and-white films
Mexican comedy films
1954 comedy films